Ptilimnium is a group of plants in the family Apiaceae described as a genus in 1819. The common name is mock bishopweed or mock bishop's weed. It is endemic to the United States, primarily in the Southeast, the Lower Mississippi Valley, and the Lower Great Plains.

Species
, Plants of the World Online accepted five species:
 Ptilimnium ahlesii Weakley & G.L.Nesom
 Ptilimnium capillaceum (Michx.) Raf. - SE + SC + NE USA
 Ptilimnium costatum (Elliott) Raf. - SC USA
 Ptilimnium nuttallii (DC.) Britton - SC USA
 Ptilimnium texense J.M. Coult. & Rose - Texas, Louisiana, Florida

Ptilimnium nodosum (Rose) Mathias, native to Georgia and South Carolina, is treated as Harperella nodosa by Plants of the World Online.

References

 
Apioideae genera
Endemic flora of the United States
Flora of the Southeastern United States
Flora of the South-Central United States
Flora of the Great Plains (North America)
Taxa named by Constantine Samuel Rafinesque